Meisterwerk 1 is a compilation album by My Dying Bride, which features both album tracks and rare recordings. Its
companion piece - Meisterwerk 2 - was released the following year. It is the second of four My Dying Bride compilation albums, following 1995's Trinity and followed by Meisterwerk 2 later the same year and "Anti-Diluvian Chronicles" in 2005.

Track listing 

 Some copies contain the Album "The Light at the End of the World" and not "Meisterwerk 1", The disc has the made in E.U. blacked out and it is unknown how many were pressed.

Credits 

 Aaron Stainthorpe - vocals, all tracks
 Andrew Craighan - guitar, all tracks (bass on tracks 1,3)
 Calvin Robertshaw - guitar on tracks 1-7,9
 Hamish Glencross - guitar on track 8
 Adrian Jackson - bass, track 2,4-9
 Martin Powell - violin, keyboard, tracks 1-7,9
 Rick Miah - drums on tracks 1-7,9
 Shaun Steels - drums on track 8
 Jonny Maudling - keyboard on track 8

References

My Dying Bride compilation albums
2000 compilation albums